Hemant Madhukar  (born 15 August 1977) is an Indian film director and writer. He is the son of the late veteran film maker, Shri K Baburao.

Filmography

Television 
 Lux Dreamgirl Gemini TV (2011) - Judge

Controversy
Madhukar was in headlines for his intimacy with Mumbai 125 KM lead actress, Veena Malik.

References
https://www.imdb.com/name/nm2597152/

External links

Living people
Film directors from Chennai
Hindi-language film directors
1977 births